Glenea exculta is a species of beetle in the family Cerambycidae. It was described by Newman in 1842.

Subspecies
 Glenea exculta exculta Newman, 1842
 Glenea exculta gracilis Aurivillius, 1924
 Glenea exculta latefasciaticollis Breuning, 1956
 Glenea exculta lineella Thomson, 1865
 Glenea exculta medioconfluens Breuning, 1956

References

exculta
Beetles described in 1842